Aleksey Leonidovich Sidorov (born August 22, 1968) is a Russian film director, screenwriter and producer.

Biography 
Aleksey was born in Severodvinsk. He studied at the Faculty of Philology of Petrozavodsk University, after which he moved to Moscow and began attending courses for scriptwriters and directors. He made his film debut in 2002.

Filmography 
 Brigada (2002)
 Shadowboxing (2005)
 Shadowboxing 2: Revenge (2007)
 Shadowboxing 3: Last Round (2011)
 22 Minutes (2014)
 T-34 (2019)
 Champion of the World'' (2021)

References

External links 
 
 Aleksey Sidorov on kino-teatr.ru

Living people
Russian film directors
1968 births
People from Severodvinsk